Bufalo can refer to: 

 Búfalo, brand of hot sauce 
 Bufalo pistol from Llama firearms
 Gaspare del Bufalo, a Roman Catholic priest and the founder of the Missionaries of the Precious Blood
 Bufalo Bill, an album of Italian singer-songwriter Francesco De Gregori.

See also 
 Buffalo (disambiguation)
 Bufalino (disambiguation)
 Buffalo Bill (disambiguation)
 Bufalos